Celebration is an album by saxophonist Eric Kloss recorded in 1979 and released on the Muse label.

Reception

The AllMusic review stated: "The playing is on a high level and the compositions are complex, but the overall music (other than the opening "Celebration") tends to be a bit dull".

Track listing 
All compositions by Eric Kloss, except as indicated.
 "Celebration" - 6:53
 "The Force" - 10:07
 "Afterglow" - 5:12
 "Heavy Connections" - 6:06
 "The Samba Express" (Barry Miles) - 7:52
 "Blue Delhi" - 7:46

Personnel 
Eric Kloss - alto saxophone, tenor saxophone
Barry Miles - piano, electric piano, synthesizer
 Kenny Karsh - guitar
Mike Richmond - bass, electric bass
Terry Silverlight - drums

References 

1980 albums
Eric Kloss albums
Muse Records albums
Albums produced by Michael Cuscuna